Steven Quincy Urkel is a fictional character on the American ABC/CBS sitcom Family Matters, portrayed by Jaleel White. Originally slated to be a one-time-only character on the show, he broke out to be its most popular character and gradually became its protagonist. Due to the Urkel character's off-putting characteristics and the way he would stir up events and underscore the plot or even move it along, he is considered a nuisance by the original protagonist's family, the Winslows, though they come to accept him over time.

The character is the epitome of a geek or nerd of the era, due to traits such as large, thick eyeglasses, flood pants held up by suspenders, multi-colored cardigan sweaters, saddle shoes, and a high-pitched voice. He professes love for his neighbor Laura Winslow, who is a character in the main family of the series, but this love of his is written as an accent on or trigger for events and crises and is therefore unrequited until the end of the series.

From the Urkel character's debut through the rest of the series' run, he is central to many of its running gags, primarily property damage and/or personal injury as a result of his inventions going awry or his outright clumsiness. He becomes known by viewers and characters alike for several catchphrases uttered after some humorous misfortune occurs, including "I've fallen and I can't get up!" "I don't have to take this. I'm going home." "Did I do that?" "Whoa, Mama!" and "Look what you did!" (on occasions when someone else caused the damage, though usually the accident was indirectly caused by Urkel).

Character development 
In syndication, Steve Urkel first appeared on the 4th episode of the first season, "Rachel's First Date" (as the show staff wanted to more naturally introduce him to audiences upon repeated viewings). In the 12th episode of the first season, "Laura's First Date", he reappears as a nerdy young boy who takes Laura Winslow out on a date. While he is madly in love with her, Laura finds Steve grating and doesn't return his affection. While intended as a minor character, Urkel became very popular for his oddball antics. He soon became a recurring character, and joined the main cast beginning with the season-two premiere "Rachel's Place".

Family Matters co-creator Michael Warren named the character after his friend, writer, and director Steve Erkel. Due to the show and the character's tremendous popularity during the early 1990s, Erkel encountered difficulties using his own name; he received many prank phone calls from "Laura" asking for "Steve", and businesses found his name to be suspicious. Warren stated that had he known that the character would reappear for years, he would not have named him after his friend.

Portrayal 
Steve Urkel embodies the stereotype of a socially inept intellectual who means well but often messes things up. Despite his intelligence, his actions often come across as clumsy and foolish. He is fiercely protective of and obsessed with his unrequited love, Laura Winslow, and this admiration extends to the rest of the Winslow family. However, Steve is comically clumsy and inept, and his attempts to help the Winslows usually go awry. This puts him at odds with the family patriarch, Carl, who routinely throws Urkel out of his house. He has shown to take responsibility for his own mistakes and reimburses the Winslows for the damages he's done. Steve is close to Harriette Winslow, who is delighted each time he comes over, much to Carl's chagrin.

Later episodes suggest that Steve's attachment to the Winslows stems from his bad relationship with his own family. Urkel often hints that most of his relatives, including his (unseen) parents, despise him and refuse to associate with him. This culminates in the two moving to Russia without him, whereupon he moves in with the Winslows. The show has also revealed that Steve has at least four relatives who care about him who are Uncle Ernie who owns a horse trailer; Uncle Cecil who, despite his gambling problems, visits the Urkel home to keep an eye on him; Aunt Oona from Altoona who is like a mother to him; and cousin Myrtle.

Urkel dresses unfashionably for someone his age (he is most commonly seen wearing suspenders, brightly colored shirts, and high water pants) and has a number of hobbies and interests, including polka dancing and accordion playing. His motor vehicle of choice is the small three-wheeled Isetta. Unlike his friends, he has little interest in popular culture and athletic endeavors, though he enjoys playing basketball, once attempting to join the school team. This has caused Myra to be attracted to Urkel himself due to them not being interested in pop culture. However, Steve has shown little interest in her mainly due to her stalker behavior.

While he is unpopular with his schoolmates, Urkel is a brilliant student and is on a first-name basis with his teachers. He is a genius inventor as well, and his fantastical but unreliable gadgets (including a transformation device and a time machine) are central to many Family Matters plots and gags.

Urkel also has an adept sense of lawbreaking that involves peer pressure. This was explored four times, mainly with Eddie, since he often has to learn his lesson the hard way when he finds himself in situations outside of his control.

Stefan Urquelle 

During the season five episode "Dr. Urkel and Mr. Cool", in a takeoff on The Nutty Professor films, Urkel devises a plan to win Laura's heart: transforming his DNA using a serum, which suppresses his "nerd genes" and brings out his "cool" genes. This results in the alter ego known as Stefan Urquelle, played by Jaleel White in more casual attire. Initially, Laura is enamored with the smoother Stefan, but asks that he turn back into Steve when Stefan's self-centeredness makes itself apparent.

Steve improves the formula in the season five episode "Stefan Returns" to reduce its negative effects on his personality, and invents a "transformation chamber" allowing him to become Stefan at will. He would change into Stefan several times – even while dating Myra – but some circumstance would force Steve to turn into his normal self again. With his narcissistic tendencies toned down, Laura falls deeply in love with Steve's alter-ego.

In the seventh-season finale "Send in the Clones", Steve creates a cloning machine and winds up creating a perfect duplicate of himself. Myra is initially excited, but eventually realizes that two Steves are just too much. To clear up the situation, Laura proposes that one of the Steves be permanently turned into Stefan, so that she and Myra can both be with the one they love. This Stefan becomes a recurring character and eventually proposes to Laura in the ninth season. After weighing her choices in the episode "Pop Goes the Question", Laura chooses Steve over Stefan. Stefan departs and is not seen again.

Cultural impact 
In 2010, Westside Middle School in Memphis, Tennessee, outlined its dress code policy on sagging pants, asking students to pull them up or get "Urkeled", a reference to the character. In this practice, teachers would forcibly pull students' pants up and attach them to their waist using zip ties. Students would also have their photo taken and posted on a board in the hallway, for all of their classmates to view. In an interview with NBC affiliate WMC-TV, Principal Bobby White stated that the general idea is to fight pop culture with pop culture. One teacher at the school claimed to have "Urkeled" up to 80 students per week, although after five weeks the number dropped to 18.

Ratings effect 
In syndication, Steve is incorporated into the teaser scene of "Rachel's First Date"; his first appearance in the original broadcasts is in the 1989 episode "Laura's First Date", in which Carl and Eddie separately set up dates for Laura for a dance or party (both terms are used in the episode), and the first thing known about him is that he allegedly ate a mouse, and he later makes reference to a mouse when speaking to Carl, implying that it might be true. Prior to Steve Urkel's introduction, the show was on the brink of cancellation due to mediocre ratings. After Urkel was introduced, several scripts had to be hastily rewritten to accommodate the character, while several first-season episodes that had been completed had new opening gag sequences filmed featuring Steve trying to push open the Winslows' front door while the family holds it shut. The addition of Steve immediately helped the show boost its modest ratings. White was credited as a guest star in the first season and became a regular member of the cast in season two.

Jo Marie Payton, who played Harriette Winslow, admitted that she felt the Urkel character had hogged much of the show's attention and disrupted the close family relationship she had formed with the rest of the cast. Payton took particular umbrage when youngest sibling Judy Winslow was dismissed as a disposable character and her portrayer, Jaimee Foxworth, was fired to make room for more Urkel stories, because she felt particularly close to Foxworth as the baby of the cast. Payton experienced increasing burnout over the course of the show, became increasingly upset over the production staff allowing White free rein to misbehave, and felt that the overbearing focus on Urkel had made the show jump the shark; she very nearly quit when the show moved to CBS but agreed to stay for the first several episodes while a new actress, Judyann Elder, was cast as Harriet. In an interview with Entertainment Tonight, Payton recalled an instance where White insisted upon inserting something that would have violated Broadcast Standards and Practices, to the point where he and Payton nearly came to physical blows with each other. White is one of the few living members of the cast with whom Payton no longer speaks regularly. She nevertheless speaks well of her experiences and appreciates the effect that Urkel had on the show's popularity and thus the residuals everyone receives from the show. Reginald VelJohnson, in a 2022 interview with Entertainment Tonight, acknowledged that White could be difficult to work with on set but attributed the difficulties to White's young age and being surrounded by other teenagers, which VelJohnson (who himself never had children) found overwhelming. On the whole, VelJohnson had "nothing but good memories" of working with White.

The Urkel Dance 
The Urkel Dance was a novelty dance that originated in the season two episode, "Life of the Party". It was based around the character of Steve Urkel and essentially incorporated movements that made the dancer's posture more like his.

The dance was popular enough to appear on another show, Step by Step, when the Steve Urkel character appeared in a crossover in the season one episode, "The Dance".

Jaleel White also performed the song, in character as Steve Urkel, on the 5th Annual American Comedy Awards. Bea Arthur (from Maude & The Golden Girls) joined him on stage to "Do The Urkel", after which she said, "Hey, MC Hammer, try and touch that!"

A promotional cassette single of the song that accompanies the dance was produced and distributed in limited numbers. A T-shirt was also produced featuring lyrics and Urkel's likeness.

Rick Sanchez pays some form of homage to The Urkel Dance with "The Rick Dance" in the Rick and Morty episode "Ricksy Business".

Appearances on other shows  
 Full House – In the 1991 episode, "Stephanie Gets Framed", Steve is called in to help Stephanie Tanner (Jodie Sweetin) deal with her anxieties after she has to get glasses. He was cousin to a friend of D.J. He also jams with Uncle Jesse and gives Michelle a penny for her piggy bank, telling her that "with prevailing interest rates, that penny will be worth three cents by the turn of the century". Incidentally, Family Matters did not air on the night of the episode's original airdate (January 25, 1991). It is implied that he found himself in San Francisco in the Full House universe before paying a visit to the Lambert household from Step by Step.
 Step by Step – In the series' second episode, "The Dance", Steve lands in the Lambert-Foster family's backyard after launching himself with a rocket pack from the living room of the Winslows' house in the Family Matters episode "Brain Over Brawn" (the two scenes being shown in uninterrupted sequence, as Family Matters and Step by Step aired back to back on ABC's TGIF lineup at the time). He then helps his science-fair pen pal, Mark Foster (Christopher Castile), and lifts Alicia "Al" Lambert (Christine Lakin)'s spirits after her potential date dumps her just before a school dance. White reprises his "Do the Urkel" dance in the scene where Al gives the boy that dumped her his comeuppance. White also makes a brief two-second cameo as Steve in the 1997 episode "A Star Is Born", snapping a clapperboard on the set of the movie that Al was cast in over her two sisters.
 In the Family Matters episode "Beauty and the Beast", Steve sends a chain letter to his friend Cory Matthews, who lived in Philadelphia. The reference is to Ben Savage's character from Boy Meets World, but there were no on-screen crossovers. In an episode of Boy Meets World, Cory says he receives a chain letter from his friend Steve.
 Fuller House - In the Season 3 finale, Urkel was mentioned by D.J.. In a January 2018 interview with TVLine's Andy Swift, series creator and former show runner Jeff Franklin mentioned that they have talked about White reprising the role and that they had some ideas for the character if White decides to reprise the role (Franklin was dismissed from the show before this materialized, and Urkel never appeared in the series).
 Scooby-Doo and Guess Who? - White reprised his role on the animated series Scooby-Doo and Guess Who? in the episode "When Urkel- Bots Go Bad!"

Merchandise 
At the height of his popularity, Urkel's name was branded to several products including a short-lived fruit flavored cereal known as Urkel-Os and a Steve Urkel pull string doll, which were both released in 1991. There was also a T-shirt line that was created in 2002, but was discontinued shortly after its inception.

In 2021 White launched his own cannabis brand that featured a strain called "Purple Urkel". He reprised the role of Urkel in a skit with Snoop Dogg to promote the strain.

Reception 
In 1999, TV Guide ranked Urkel #27 on its list of the "50 Greatest TV Characters of All Time". In 2004, he was listed at #98 in Bravo's 100 Greatest TV Characters.

Notes 

American male characters in television
American sitcom television characters
Family Matters
Fictional African-American people
Fictional biochemists
Fictional characters from Chicago
Fictional characters with alter egos
Fictional clones
Fictional geneticists
Fictional inventors
Fictional mechanical engineers
Fictional models
Fictional musicians
Fictional NASA astronauts
Teenage characters in television
Television characters introduced in 1989
Time travelers